George W. Herring (June 18, 1933 - November 8, 1994), born in Gadsden, Alabama, was a professional American football quarterback and punter in the American Football League. Herring played with the Denver Broncos in 1960 and 1961.

Herring played college football at Jones County Junior College and then transferred to Mississippi Southern in Hattiesburg. Selected by the San Francisco 49ers in the sixteenth round (184th overall) of the 1956 NFL Draft, Herring signed instead in Canada and threw eight touchdowns to 20 interceptions in two seasons with the B.C. Lions and Saskatchewan Roughriders. In 1960, he joined the Broncos at the start of the AFL. In Denver, Herring backed up his roommate Frank Tripucka and threw five touchdowns to 23 interceptions while also serving as the team’s punter. In a 1961 loss at Houston on November 26, he threw a franchise record six interceptions.

Herring had a problem with alcohol and was found homeless on the streets of Denver in 1982. After staying sober for several years, he had a relapse in 1994 and committed suicide within two days of his 25-year-old son Lance also killing himself. In a bizarre side note, Lance’s stepfather had also committed suicide two months before. Herring also had two other children.

References

External links
The Quarterback Abstract: Ranking the Quarterbacks in Modern Day History

1934 births
1994 deaths
Players of American football from Alabama
Sportspeople from Gadsden, Alabama
American football quarterbacks
American football punters
Denver Broncos (AFL) players
Jones County Bobcats football players
Southern Miss Golden Eagles football players
Canadian football quarterbacks
BC Lions players
Saskatchewan Roughriders players